R J Balson & Son  is a high-street butcher in the market town of Bridport, Dorset. According to the Institute for Family Business, it is the oldest continually trading family business in the United Kingdom. It has been in the Balson family since 1515 when Robert Balson rented a market stall on Bridport Shambles.

Since 1892 its butcher's shop has been located at 9 West Allington, Bridport, not far from its original location.

It was featured in the BBC Four television programme Hidden Histories: Britain’s Oldest Family Businesses, broadcast on 15 January 2014.

See also
 List of butcher shops

References

External links
Official website
Institute for Family Business

Butcher shops
Companies based in Dorset
History of Dorset
Bridport
Shops in England